Rafael Martins Vieira da Silva (born 27 December 1995), sometimes known as just Rafael, is a Brazilian footballer who last played for AS Trenčín as a defender.

Club career

AS Trenčín
Rafael Vieira made his professional Fortuna Liga debut for AS Trenčín against ŽP Šport Podbrezová on 6 August 2016.

References

External links
 AS Trenčín official club profile
 
 Futbalnet profile

1995 births
Living people
Brazilian footballers
Brazilian expatriate footballers
Association football defenders
AS Trenčín players
Slovak Super Liga players
Brazilian expatriate sportspeople in Slovakia
Expatriate footballers in Slovakia
Footballers from São Paulo
Macaé Esporte Futebol Clube players